Curt Courant (11 May 1899 – 20 April 1968) was a German cinematographer who worked on over a hundred films during the silent and early sound eras. Courant worked in several European countries, collaborating with figures such as Alfred Hitchcock and Fritz Lang. As he was of Jewish ancestry, Courant was forced to leave Germany in 1933 and go into exile following the Nazi takeover of power. Courant worked at several of the leading British studios during the mid-1930s. He is the uncle of Willy Kurant who also became a cinematographer.

Selected filmography

 The Onyx Head (1917)
 Waves of Fate (1918)
The Sacrifice (1918)
 The World Champion (1919)
 The Enchanted Princess (1919)
 The Foolish Heart (1919)
 State Attorney Jordan (1919)
 Only a Servant (1919)
 Irrlicht (1919)
 A Man's Word (1919)
 The Heart of Casanova (1919)
 Between Two Worlds (1919)
 The Bodega of Los Cuerros (1919)
 The Golden Lie (1919)
 The Commandment of Love (1919)
 Devoted Artists (1919)
 All Souls (1919)
 The Fairy of Saint Ménard (1919)
 The Last Sun Son (1919)
 The Bride of the Incapacitated (1919)
 Black Pearls (1919)
 In the Whirl of Life (1920)
 Forbidden Love (1920)
 President Barrada (1920)
 The Girl from Acker Street (1920)
 Comrades (1921)
 Hamlet (1921)
 Queen of the Streets (1921)
 The Stranger from Alster Street (1921)
 Alfred von Ingelheim's Dramatic Life (1921)
 A Day on Mars (1921)
 The Secret of Castle Ronay (1922)
 The Blood (1922)
 The Anthem of Love (1922)
 Peter the Great (1922)
 Paradise in the Snow (1923)
 The Slipper Hero (1923)
 Two Children (1924)
 Comedians of Life (1924)
 Quo Vadis (1924)
 Fire of Love (1925)
 The Island of Dreams (1925)
 The Brothers Schellenberg (1926)
 The Flight in the Night (1926)
 When She Starts, Look Out (1926)
 The Little Variety Star (1926)
 The Wooing of Eve (1926)
 The World Wants To Be Deceived (1926)
 Countess Ironing-Maid (1926)
 Family Gathering in the House of Prellstein (1927)
 The Trial of Donald Westhof (1927)
 The Csardas Princess (1927)
 The Dashing Archduke (1927)
 Secrets of the Orient (1928)
 Guilty (1928)
Woman in the Moon (1929)
 The Woman One Longs For (1929)
 The Burning Heart (1929)
 The Singing City (1930)
 The King of Paris (1930, German)
 The King of Paris (1930, French)
 The White Devil (1930)
City of Song (1931)
 My Cousin from Warsaw (1931)
 The Man Who Murdered (1931)
 Who Takes Love Seriously? (1931)
 The Unknown Singer (1931)
 Rasputin, Demon with Women (1932)
 His Highness Love (1931)
 This One or None (1932)
 Gitta Discovers Her Heart (1932)
 Scampolo (1932)
 A Son from America (1932)
 Thea Roland (1932)
 Ciboulette (1933)
Perfect Understanding (1933)
 (1934)
The Iron Duke (1934)
The Man Who Knew Too Much (1934)
Amok (1934)
 The Higher Command (1935)
Me and Marlborough (1935)
The Passing of the Third Floor Back (1935)
She Knew What She Wanted (1936)
Man in the Mirror (1936)
Broken Blossoms (1936)
Spy of Napoleon (1936)
 Cheer Up (1936)
Dusty Ermine (1936)
 The Lie of Nina Petrovna (1937)
 Clothes and the Woman (1937)
 Princess Tarakanova (1938)
La Bête Humaine (1938)
 Lights of Paris (1938)
Le Jour Se Lève (1939)
Louise (1939)
 Monsieur Brotonneau (1939)
Sarajevo (1940)
Monsieur Verdoux (1947) uncredited
It Happened in Athens (1962)

Bibliography
Bock, Hans-Michael & Bergfelder, Tim. The Concise Cinegraph: Encyclopaedia of German Cinema. Berghahn Books, 2009.

External links

1899 births
1968 deaths
German cinematographers
Film people from Berlin
Jewish emigrants from Nazi Germany to the United Kingdom